Christian Focus Publications (CFP) is a conservative, evangelical publishing house in the United Kingdom.

CFP was established in the early 1970s, and is located in Fearn, Ross-shire. The managing director is William Mackenzie.

CFP has four imprints: 
 Christian Focus - popular adult titles
 CF4K - children's books
 Christian Heritage - reprints
 Mentor - scholarly works

References

External links

Christian publishing companies
Companies based in Highland (council area)
1970s establishments in Scotland